The Garuda was a custom one off world cruising yacht designed by Ron Holland and built by Nautor's Swan and first launched in 1986.

References

External links
 Nautor Swan

Sailing yachts
Keelboats
2000s sailboat type designs
Sailboat types built by Nautor Swan
Sailboat type designs by Ron Holland